Dueck or Dück is a German surname, a spelling variety of Dyck, which mostly comes from the Dutch surname (van) Dijck. The name is wide spread among Russian Mennonites. It may refer to:

 Alexander Dück (born April 22, 1980), German professional ice hockey player
 Alvin Dueck (born 1943), American psychologist and theologian
 Dora Dueck (born 1950), Canadian writer
 Josh Dueck (born January 13, 1981), Canadian alpine skier 
 Peter Albert Dueck (July 5, 1923 – February 19, 2015), politician and cabinet minister of British Columbia
 Tyler Dueck (born December 17, 1986), Canadian racing driver

See also 
 Duck (surname)

Russian Mennonite surnames